John Kimmons Walton  is a professor at the University of the Basque Country, Leioa, Spain. Walton is an expert on the history of the development of tourism, and particularly the English seaside.

Walton was previously Professor of Modern Social History at Lancaster University, Professor of Social History at the University of Central Lancashire, and Professor of Social History in the Institute of Northern Studies, Leeds Metropolitan University. He was a Member of the Chetham Society, serving as a Member of Council from 1989 and as General Editor from 1991 to 2004.

Selected publications

References

Academic staff of the University of the Basque Country
Alumni of the University of Oxford
Academics of Leeds Beckett University
Academics of the University of Central Lancashire
Academics of Lancaster University
Living people
Year of birth missing (living people)
Chetham Society